Dongjiao may refer to the following locations in China:

 Dongjiao Subdistrict, Tongling (东郊街道), in Shizishan District, Tongling, Anhui
 Dongjiao Subdistrict, Shijiazhuang (东焦街道), in Xinhua District, Shijiazhuang, Hebei
 Dongjiao Subdistrict, Guangzhou (东漖街道), in Liwan District, Guangzhou, Guangdong
 Dongjiao Subdistrict, Ningbo (东郊街道), in Jiangdong District, Ningbo, Zhejiang
 Dongjiao, Putian, in Xiuyu District, Putian, Fujian
 Dongjiao, Wenchang (东郊镇), town in Hainan